12th National Board of Review Awards
December 22, 1940
The 12th National Board of Review Awards were announced on 22 December 1940.

Best American Films
The Grapes of Wrath
The Great Dictator
Of Mice and Men
Our Town
Fantasia
The Long Voyage Home
Foreign Correspondent
The Biscuit Eater
Gone with the Wind
Rebecca

Winners
Best American Film: The Grapes of Wrath
Best Foreign Film: La femme du boulanger (The Baker's Wife), France
Best Documentary: The Fight for Life
Best Acting:
Jane Bryan - We Are Not Alone
Charles Chaplin - The Great Dictator
Jane Darwell - The Grapes of Wrath
Betty Field - Of Mice and Men
Henry Fonda - The Grapes of Wrath and The Return of Frank James
Joan Fontaine - Rebecca
Greer Garson - Pride and Prejudice
William Holden - Our Town
Vivien Leigh - Gone with the Wind and Waterloo Bridge
Thomas Mitchell - The Long Voyage Home
Raimu - The Baker's Wife
Ralph Richardson - On the Night of the Fire
Flora Robson - We Are Not Alone
Ginger Rogers - Primrose Path
George Sanders - Rebecca
Martha Scott - Our Town
James Stewart - The Shop Around the Corner
Conrad Veidt - Escape

Notes

External links
National Board of Review of Motion Pictures :: Awards for 1940

1940
1940 film awards
1940 in American cinema